Yanghe Township is a township under the administration of Longde County, Ningxia, China. , it has five villages under its administration.

References 

Township-level divisions of Ningxia
Longde County